Barbosella dolichorhiza is a species of orchid. It is native to Costa Rica, Nicaragua, Colombia, Peru and Ecuador.

References

dolichorhiza
Orchids of Central America
Orchids of Peru
Orchids of Colombia
Orchids of Ecuador
Plants described in 1920